Lisa Charise Brooks (née, Page; born November 23, 1962) is an American urban contemporary gospel, traditional black gospel, and gospel music recording artist and musician. She started her music career, in 1986, with her quartet, Witness. Her solo music career began in 1997, while she has since released four solo studio albums, More Than You'll Ever Know in 1997, Lisa Page Brooks in 2001, Strong in 2009, and Ready in 2013. Three of those albums charted on the Billboard magazine charts.

Early life
Page Brooks was born Lisa Charise Page, on November 23, 1962, in Detroit, Michigan, the daughter of Charles Warren Harris.

Music career
Her music career started in 1986, with the female black gospel quartet, Witness. She commenced her solo music recording career in 1997, with the studio album, More Than You'll Ever Know, that was released on April 8, 1997, from A&M Records. This was her breakthrough release upon the Billboard magazine charts, while it placed on the Gospel Albums chart, where it peaked at No. 32. Her subsequent studio album, Lisa Page Brooks, was released on July 31, 2001, with Air Gospel. The third album, Strong, was released on October 20, 2009, by Habakkuk Music, and this album peaked at No. 18 on the Billboard Gospel Albums chart. She released, Ready, on June 4, 2013, where this album peaked at No. 17 on the Billboard Gospel Albums chart.

Personal life
She is married to Bishop Michael Alan Brooks of gospel group, Commissioned, and a daughter, together they reside in Detroit, Michigan.

Discography

Studio albums

References

External links
Official Facebook
Official Twitter

1962 births
Living people
African-American songwriters
African-American Christians
Songwriters from Michigan
A&M Records artists
Singers from Detroit
American gospel singers
21st-century African-American people
20th-century African-American people